Mirza Agha Ibrahim Estahbanati Shirazi (died Hijra 1379) was a Shia Islam Jurist and religious scholar in Iran.

Early life 
He was born in Estahbanat in Fars province in Iran at 1279 lunar Hijrah. He was inspired by his father who  was a religious authority.

He was educated in the religious school of Estahbanat. He studied under teachers such as Shaykh Muhammad Baqir Estahbanati, Mirza Muhammad Baqir Estahbanati and Shaykh Jafar Mahallati in Disciplines like Fiqh and principles.

He continued his education in Najaf . He learned Fiqh from eminent scholars such as Mohammed Kazem Yazdi, Muhammad Kazim Khorasani, Mirza Muhammad Taqi Shirazi and others.

Career 
He was selected as the authority of Shia minority after the death of Mirza Muhammad Taqi Shirazi. He was appointed to the authority of Iran, India and Pakistan and other countries near the Persian gulf.

He participated in political activities and supported Fadaian Islam and individuals such as Sayyed Mojtaba Navvab Safavi.

He taught students such as Banu Nosrat Amin, Sayyed Shahab Al Din Mar'ashi Najafi, Shaykh Ibrahim Kalbasi, Shaykh Moslem Malakouti Tabrizi, Sayyed Muhammad Hasan Taliqani. He wrote many books in disciplines such as jurisprudence and principles:
Glosses on "Orvat Al Vosqa"
Glosses on "Zakhirat Al Ibad"
The book of Taharat
The book of Pilgrimage
The book of Khoms
Some problems on convictions

See also 
 Navvab Safavi
 Fadayan-e Islam
 Mohammad Ibrahim Kalbasi

References

External links 
 Sayyed Ibrahim Estahbanati

Iranian ayatollahs
20th-century Iranian politicians
People of the Persian Constitutional Revolution
1960 deaths